Riggs is an English surname. Notable people with the surname include:

Anna Rankin Riggs (1835-1908), American social reformer
Arthur Riggs (geneticist) (1939-2022), American geneticist
Arthur Stanley Riggs (1879–1952), American author and historian
Bobby Riggs (1918–1995), American tennis player
Chandler Riggs (born 1999), American actor
Christina Riggs, British-American historian
Christina Marie Riggs (1971–2000), American murderer
Cody Riggs (born 1991), American football player
Dax Riggs (born 1973), American musician
Derek Riggs (born 1958), British artist
Dudley Riggs (1932–2020), American comedian
Dudley Riggs (American football) (1875–1913), American football player
Elmer S. Riggs (1869–1963), American paleontologist
Frank Riggs (born 1950), American politician
George Washington Riggs (1813–1881), American banker and businessman
Gerald Riggs (born 1960), American football player
Grattan Riggs (1835–1899), US-Australian "Irish" actor
James Garland Riggs (born 1941), American saxophonist
Jerry Riggs (born 1956), American musician
Joe Riggs (born 1982), American mixed martial artist
John M. Riggs, American army general
Lawrason Riggs (1861–1940), American businessman and art collector
 Lutah Maria Riggs  (1896–1984), American architect
Marcia Y. Riggs, American scholar, professor and theologian
Marlon Riggs (1957–1994), American poet, educator, filmmaker, and activist
Mike Riggs (born 1971), American guitarist
Nina Riggs (1977–2017), American writer and poet
Richard William Riggs (1938-2022), American judge
Scott Riggs (born 1971), American race car driver
Sheila M. Riggs, American dentistry academic
Thomas Riggs, Jr. (1873–1945), American politician and engineer
William "Billy" Riggs, American professor, author, engineer, urban planner and musician

Fictional characters
Jessica Riggs, character in Prancer
Martin Riggs, a police officer in Lethal Weapon
Mr. Riggs, character in Under Capricorn
Mrs. Riggs, character in Under Capricorn

Other uses
Scotty Riggs (born 1971), ring name of American wrestler Scott Antol
Riggs, a rock band; see Jerry Riggs
Riggs' disease
Riggs, Missouri
Riggs Glacier
Riggs Bank, former bank in the Washington, D.C., area
Riggs-Tompkins Building, listed on the National Register of Historic Places in Washington, D.C.

See also
Rig (disambiguation)
Rigg (disambiguation)
Rigging

English-language surnames